The Fujifilm X10 is a 2/3 sensor digital compact camera announced by Fujifilm on September 1, 2011. At the time of its release, it competed most closely with the Panasonic Lumix DMC-LX5, Olympus XZ-1, Canon PowerShot G1 X and Sony Cyber-shot DSC-RX100, and was subsequently named a 2013 iF product design award recipient.

The X10 was noted for its 2/3 inch type sensor, "twice as large as those used in almost all traditional compacts" at the time, and its EXR colour filter layout, allowing either greater dynamic range or lower noise to be recorded in an image of reduced resolution, as well as a conventional full resolution image. The X10's optical tunnel viewfinder zooms in synchrony with the 28-112mm equivalent, f/2.0 to f/2.8 maximum aperture zoom lens that was described as "impressively bright".

The X10 was the first of a new line of compact cameras from Fujifilm, with the letter X and two digits in the product name. Its immediate successor was the Fujifilm X20 in January 2013.

Construction
The X10 has magnesium alloy top and bottom plates, and a mechanical zoom ring. According to Fujifilm, the fact that 1mm rather than 0.8mm aluminium sheets were chosen for the front and rear makes the camera "nearly twice as rigid as ordinary cameras". Besides controlling zoom, the zoom ring is also used to power on the camera.

General reception
Imaging-Resource noted that "the zoom lens obscures the lower right quadrant of the optical viewfinder", from about 45mm equivalent focal length to 28mm wide angle. Additionally, the user's index finger may appear in the viewfinder while zooming. In spite of this, Imaging-Resource expressed a preference for the zoom ring experience, and TechCrunch referred to the viewfinder shading as "more quaint than problematic".

PC Magazine bemoaned the absence of visual focus confirmation, and lack of an ability to have auditory focus confirmation without also playing an artificial shutter sound clip. However, they also wrote that the camera "nailed the focus quickly and consistently", and rated the camera 4.0 out of 5.

Conditional product recall: the "white orbs"
At least some early-release X10 specimens had a flaw that could make "white orbs" appear in images. As a first response, in early February 2012, Fujifilm released a firmware update to mitigate the issue, but this was not successful. Fujifilm then also modified the sensor and in early March announced a sensor replacement program for any cameras affected by the issue. Tech publication DPReview judged the replacement to successfully address the problem, and Fujifilm reported that complaints quickly diminished after the free replacement program was launched.

References

X10
Live-preview digital cameras
Cameras introduced in 2011